The J. League Cup 1992, officially the '92 J.League Yamazaki Nabisco Cup, was the 18th edition of Japan soccer league cup tournament and the first edition under the current J. League Cup format. The championship started on September 5 and finished on November 23, 1992.

Round robin

Knockout phase

Semifinals

Final

References

Official report 

 

1992 domestic association football cups
1992
Lea